The Society of Advocates in Aberdeen is an independent non-regulatory professional body of solicitors in the northern Scottish city of Aberdeen and its surrounding area. It is a membership organisation providing a library, continuing professional development (CPD) courses and social events for its members, as well as engaging in representative activities, similar in form to the Society of Writers to Her Majesty's Signet (WS Society) in Edinburgh and the Royal Faculty of Procurators in Glasgow. The Society has its base in the Advocates Hall, located on Concert Court behind the Sheriff Court.

Despite the name, its membership is drawn from the solicitors' profession, and not members of the Faculty of Advocates. Although membership of the Society was previously a requirement for the practice of law, this is no longer the case and the Society has no regulatory role, this being the province of the Law Society of Scotland. Its members are permitted to title themselves, Advocate in Aberdeen.

History
The date of the Society's foundation is unknown, as its records were destroyed in a fire in 1721. The people and motives behind its establishment are therefore unknown, but presumed to have arisen "out of the natural expression of the desire of members of any profession to incorporate themselves for the purpose of mutual assistance and the exchange of professional expertise." Royal Charters were issued in 1774, 1799 and 1862. In 1787, a Library was established which grew to contain a large collection of books, on both legal and non-legal matters. The first Advocates Hall was built in 1837, and the present in 1870.

Membership of the Society was for many years required in order to be permitted to practise before the courts of Aberdeen. This requirement was removed by the Law Agents (Scotland) Act 1873, which eliminated the exclusive right of Society members to appear in the local courts, and the Solicitors (Scotland) Act 1933 and Legal Aid and Solicitors (Scotland) 1949, which created the Law Society of Scotland as the national professional body for solicitors. Since then, the Society has adapted to changes in the profession to become a voluntary membership body providing Library and research services near the Sheriff Court, training courses to meet the requirement of every solicitor to undertake at least twenty hours' continuing professional development per year, opportunities for networking and social interaction, and representation to amongst others the Law Society and local and national government.

Advocates Hall

The Society had convened for some three hundred years in various venues in Aberdeen, including latterly its own room in the Sheriff Court, before, having amassed a significant literary collection and requiring dedicated space for social functions, a decision was made to erect independent accommodation. The Society's first permanent home was built in 1837 on the corner of Back Wynd and Union Street, adjacent to the churchyard of the Kirk of St Nicholas. The Society remained here until 1870 when a new Hall was built on Concert Close, a short lane directly behind the city's iconic Sheriff Court building on Union Street.

The Hall, which is Category A listed, is a two-storey structure containing a large reception area, committee room and office, and a large Library with gallery and purpose-built timber bookcases. The architect of the Hall was James Matthews, who also designed the arched balustrade running the length of Union Terrace Gardens and from 1883 to 1886 was Lord Provost of Aberdeen.
Room hire is available for very reasonable rates, full details on the Venue Hire page of the website.

Membership
Although membership of the Society was previously a requirement for the practice of law, this is no longer the case and membership is now voluntary. Applications for membership must be subscribed by three members of the Society and are exhibited in the Advocates Hall for fourteen days to facilitate objection by other members. The application is then laid before the next meeting of the Management Committee for approval, after which the applicant becomes a member. An annual subscription is charged, set in October 2010 at £125, with reduced rates available to those aged over sixty-five, those not holding a current Practising Certificate, trainees, and those up to five years newly qualified.  We now also have an Associate membership for lecturers or members of the Judiciary.

The Society seeks to present membership as conferring a degree of prestige, as well as inspiring confidence in a member's professional abilities. It also draws attention to the social and networking opportunities membership presents, which it suggests can not only lead to greater camaraderie amongst practitioners but facilitate resolution of business matters in a non-adversarial fashion.

References

External links
Website of the Society of Advocates in Aberdeen
Article on the history of the Society

Legal organisations based in Scotland
Libraries in Scotland
Law libraries in the United Kingdom
Organisations based in Aberdeen